Watch Hill Castle (also known as Yarwood Castle, Castle Hill, and Bowdon Watch) is a medieval motte-and-bailey on the boundary of Bowdon and Dunham Massey, Greater Manchester, England. It is a scheduled monument. The castle is located north of the River Bollin and south of a deep ravine.

History
Substantial dating evidence has not been recovered from the site, but the form of the castle as a timber motte-and-bailey would date it to between the Norman Conquest and the 13th century. The lack of documentary evidence relating to the castle may be attributed to the short term nature of the timber construction; motte-and-baileys were quick to establish and would not necessarily have been used for long periods. A coin found on the site dating to the reign of Henry II, 1154 to 1189, may indicate that the castle was built during this period. The castle most likely belonged to Hamo de Mascy who was involved with the rebellion against Henry II in 1173. The castle had fallen out of use by the 13th century.

Later history and investigation 
In the 19th century, W. T. Pownall found a penny from the reign of Henry II at the castle.

In 1976 the North Cheshire Archaeology Group carried out excavations at the castle under the direction of Barry Johnson. The aims of the dig were to find dating evidence for the castle's foundation, and to establish whether it was a motte-and-bailey. While no dating evidence was recovered from the four trenches that were opened, hearths and potholes were discovered on top of the motte.

The castle was designated a scheduled monument in 1978.  As the only scheduled monument in Trafford it is arguably the most important archaeological site in the borough. Volunteers from South Trafford Archaeological Group (STAG) and students from the University of Manchester carried out a measured survey of the castle's earthworks in 1997. STAG also conducted a geophysical survey in 2005 and established the position of the bailey's eastern ditch.

Layout

The remains of Watch Hill Castle consist of two parts: an artificial mound (a motte) and an enclosure (a bailey). The north side of the bailey was doubly protected by the terrain sloping away steeply, and the south side was protected by the river.

Conservation 

Writing in the mid-1980s, archaeologists Keri Brown and Barry Johnson observed that the motte was overgrown with trees and a footpath was causing erosion of the motte. Watch Hill Castle's proximity to the River Bollin presents a conservation challenge. As the 21st century progresses, the river is more likely to flood as a result of climate change. This  could erode the remains of the castle.

See also
List of castles in Greater Manchester
Scheduled monuments in Greater Manchester

References

Bibliography

External links

Gatehouse Gazetteer record for Watch Hill Castle, containing a comprehensive bibliography

Castles in Greater Manchester
Buildings and structures in Trafford
Scheduled monuments in Greater Manchester
Archaeological sites in Greater Manchester